Thozhilalar Munnetra Sangam, Padaithurai Udaithozhirsalai (OCF Avadi) represents the working class of OCF Avadi working under Ministry of Defence is affiliated with National Progressive Defence Employees Federation (NPDEF) & Labour Progressive Federation (LPF). It is recognised by Ministry of Defence, Government of India and represents at Various forums like Joint Consultative Machinary (JCM ), Works Committee Local Productivity Council ( LPC), Central Safety Council (CSC) and Estate Coordination Committee ( ECC)etc.

Trade unions in India
Labour Progressive Federation
Mining trade unions
Mining in India